Adam Berti (born July 1, 1986, in Scarborough, Ontario) is a professional ice hockey left winger. He was drafted by the Chicago Blackhawks in the third round, 68th overall, of the 2004 NHL Entry Draft from the Oshawa Generals of the Ontario Hockey League. He made his National Hockey League debut with Chicago near the end of the 2007–08 season.

Career statistics

Regular season and playoffs

International

External links

1986 births
Living people
Canadian ice hockey left wingers
Chicago Blackhawks draft picks
Chicago Blackhawks players
Erie Otters players
Norfolk Admirals players
Oshawa Generals players
Pensacola Ice Pilots players
Rockford IceHogs (AHL) players
Sportspeople from Scarborough, Toronto
Ice hockey people from Toronto